Swing it, magistern! is a Swedish film which was released to cinemas in Sweden on 21 December 1940, directed by Schamyl Bauman and starring Adolf Jahr and Alice Babs.

Synopsis 

Young student Inga Danell secretly performs at nightclubs as Linda Loy.

Cast 
Adolf Jahr as "Susen" Bergman
Alice Babs as Inga Danell / Linda Loy (credited as Alice "Babs" Nilson)
Solveig Hedengran as Lena Larsson
Carl Hagman as William, principal (credited as Quarl Hagman)
Viran Rydkvist as Agda Löfbeck
Thor Modéen as Karl-Otto Löfbeck
John Botvid as Gustafsson 
Georg Funkquist as Furubeck
Linnéa Hillberg as Fru Danell, Ingas mother
Julia Cæsar as Miss Jonsson 
Åke Johansson as Axel "Acke" Danell, Ingas brother 
Nils Hallberg as Göran, student 
Ulla Hodell as Sonja Holmqvist, student  
Britt Hagman as Olga Pettersson, student 
Ragnar Planthaber as "Plantan", student 
Kaj Hjelm as "Smutte" Lindström, student  
Bert Sorbon as Ture Andersson, student

Soundtrack 
"Quick-foxtrot" composed by Eskil Eckert-Lundin, Instrumental.
"Videvisan" composed by Alice Tegnér, lyrics by Zacharias Topelius
"Svarta Rudolf" composed by Robert Norrby, lyrics by Erik Axel Karlfeldt, performed by Bert Sorbon
"Ich bin von Kopf bis Fuss auf Liebe angestellt" composed by Friedrich Hollaender, lyrics by Svasse Bergqvist
"Sjungom studentens lyckliga dag" composed by Prins Gustav, lyrics by Herman Sätherberg, performed by Åke Johansson
"Swing it, magistern!" composed by Kai Gullmar, lyrics by Hasse Ekman, performed by Alice Babs and Adolf Jahr
"Min kärlek till dej" composed by Sten Axelson
"Swing Ling Lej" composed by Thore Ehrling and Eskil Eckert-Lundin, lyrics by Hasse Ekman, performed by Alice Babs
"Gymnastikrepetition" composed by Eskil Eckert-Lundin, Instrumental.
"Regntunga skyar" composed by Thore Ehrling and Eskil Eckert-Lundin, lyrics by Hasse Ekman, performed by Alice Babs and Adolf Jahr
"Fria preludier" composed by Adolf Jahr, instrumentalist Adolf Jahr (the piano)
"Paris" composed by Ingrid Muschkin
"Swing" composed by Thore Ehrling
"Oh Boy, Oh Boy" composed by Sten Axelson, lyrics by Hasse Ekman, performed by Alice Babs
" Engelbrektsmarschen", Instrumental.
"Pojkmarsch" composed by Harry Lundahl, Instrumental.
"Là ci darem la mano" from Don Giovanni composed by Wolfgang Amadeus Mozart, performed by Ragnar Planthaber and Ulla Hodell.

Awards and honors 
In 1941 Schamyl Bauman won a commendation at the Venice Film Festival for this film and for Magistrarna på sommarlov.

References

External links 
 
 

1940 films
1940s Swedish-language films
1940 musical comedy films
Films about educators
Films directed by Schamyl Bauman
Swedish musical comedy films
Swedish black-and-white films
1940s Swedish films